Barming railway station is located in Tonbridge and Malling Borough, west of Maidstone in Kent, England, and approximately 1 mile from Barming and Maidstone Hospital. The station and all trains serving it are operated by Southeastern.

History
The goods yard had two sidings, one of which served a goods shed. Freight facilities were withdrawn on 5 December 1960. The signal box closed on 24 April 1982.

The platforms are of 6-car length only, despite the majority of services throughout the day being formed of 8 cars. The original station building remains on the down (Country-bound) platform 2, with a substantial wooden shelter on the up (London-bound) platform. The ticket office is staffed for limited hours during the morning peak period on Mondays to Fridays; at other times a PERTIS 'permit to travel' machine, also located on the down platform, suffices. A passenger information screen is located on the down platform 2 and provides information relating to train running times for both platforms. The station entrances/exits are on the down Platform 2. There is no level access to Platform 1.

The concrete footbridge which spanned the tracks at the western end of the station, linking the platforms, was life-expired and demolished in early 2013. It was an example of the standard pre-fabricated design built at the Southern Railway's concrete factory at Exmouth Junction, east of Exeter. The replacement footbridge to the standard Network Rail design is at the extreme eastern end of the station.

Facilities
The station has a ticket office and customer waiting room which are staffed during the weekday mornings only (05:50-09:15). At other times the station is unstaffed and tickets must be purchased from the self-service ticket machine at the station with modern help points available for customer information.

The station has a chargeable car park with 80 spaces at its entrance which is operated by Saba Parking. There is also a small 16 capacity cycle rack at the station entrance.

The station has step-free access available to the Ashford bound platform although the London bound platform is only reachable by the use of steps.

Services
All services at Barming are operated by Southeastern using  and  EMUs.

The typical off-peak service in trains per hour is:

 1 tph to 
 1 tph to 

During the peak hours, the station is served by an additional hourly service between London Victoria and Ashford International, increasing the service to 2 tph in each direction.

Bus Connections
The station is served by Nu-Venture route 58 which provides hourly connections to Maidstone Hospital, West Malling and Wrotham Heath. There is no Sunday service on this route.

References
References

Notes

External links

Borough of Maidstone
Railway stations in Kent
DfT Category E stations
Former London, Chatham and Dover Railway stations
Railway stations in Great Britain opened in 1874
Railway stations served by Southeastern
1874 establishments in England